Prior to the amendment of Tamil Nadu Entertainments Tax Act 1939 on 27 September 2011, Gross was 115 per cent of Nett for films with non-Tamil titles. Post-amendment, Gross jumped to 130 per cent of Nett for films with non-Tamil titles and U certificates as well. Commercial Taxes Department disclosed 59.43 crore in entertainment tax revenue for the year.

The following is a list of films produced in the Tamil cinema in India that released in 2011.

List of released films

January – June

July – December

Awards

Notable deaths

References

Tamil
2011
2011 in Indian cinema